Krokus is a hard rock/heavy metal band from Switzerland. They enjoyed success in North America during the 1980s.

Krokus was founded in Solothurn in 1974 by Chris von Rohr (vocals and multi-instruments) and Tommy Kiefer (guitar), both former members of Kaktus. Former TEA vocalist Marc Storace joined the band as frontman in time for their Metal Rendez-vous album in 1980.

History

Formation (1974–1981) 
Krokus was formed in 1974 as a primarily progressive rock act. The group's original lead singer, Peter Richard, left before the first album was recorded, leaving lead guitarist Tommy Kiefer to handle lead vocal duties for the band's self-titled debut album. However, Chris von Rohr, originally the drummer, would switch to lead vocals for the follow-up record, To You All, remaining in this capacity into the late 1970s (along with playing keyboards and percussion). Rounding out the radically different new line-up were guitarist Fernando von Arb, bassist Jürg Naegeli, and drummer Freddy Steady who had released the "Rock Is Here" 7" as a trio under the name Montezuma in 1976. With this incarnation, Krokus became successful in Switzerland, touring throughout the country and releasing a third album, Painkiller, in 1978. After seeing AC/DC in concert in the late 1970s, they decided to change their musical direction and adopted a new sound which was heavily influenced by that band. Since von Rohr possessed limited vocal abilities and was not capable of hitting the third octave, the band decided to hire a new lead vocalist. Eventually, after trying out several other frontmen, Marc Storace, formerly of TEA and Eazy Money, was hired in 1979. With the new line-up in place, the band recorded and released the album Metal Rendez-vous in 1980, which was Krokus' first hit and brought the band international recognition.

The 1981 follow-up album, Hardware, was recorded at the Roundhouse Studios in London and featured such songs as "Easy Rocker" and "Rock City", which are still a part of the band's live repertoire today. Lead guitarist Tommy Kiefer was forced to leave the band due to a heroin addiction early into the tour supporting Hardware and was replaced by newcomer Mandy Meyer (ex-BM Smith). Kiefer would commit suicide on 24 December 1986 for failure to conquer his heroin addiction. He was 34 years old. Meyer soon left, replaced by Mark Kohler, and teamed up with bassist Tommy Keiser (not to be confused with Tommy Kiefer) of fellow Swiss rockers Roxane to start his own band. Setting up headquarters in Memphis, Tennessee under the guidance of Krokus manager Butch Stone, the duo would recruit former Target vocalist Jimi Jamison, ex-Black Oak Arkansas guitarist/keyboardist Jack Holder, and drummer Jeff Klaven and issued their sole album, First Strike, under the name Cobra in 1983. Klaven and Keiser would both subsequently join Krokus. Meyer went on to join Asia and formed the short-lived Katmandu, although he would return to the Krokus line-up himself some years later. Jamison went on to perform backing vocals on Krokus recordings, in addition to replacing Dave Bickler in the band Survivor and achieving massive success with that group.

Rise to popularity and success years (1982–1988) 
In 1982, with new American management, Krokus recorded One Vice at a Time, which features the hits, "Long Stick Goes Boom," and the Guess Who cover, "American Woman". By the time this album was recorded, the band had parted ways with Naegeli, at which point multi-instrumentalist von Rohr assumed the additional role of primary bassist. This album was also the first to feature Mark Kohler on guitar. Chris von Rohr described the album at the time as "the album AC/DC never made", as the influence of the Australian band is difficult to ignore. The comparisons actually cast doubt on the creativity of the band, as many listeners now, in spite of the Swiss band's much wider musical spectrum, began to regard Krokus merely as AC/DC imitators. Nevertheless, Krokus became increasingly popular in Europe and began to receive attention and success in the United States.

1983's Headhunter was the band's first album awarded with Gold album status in the United States and hit number 25 in the 1983 Billboard 200 album chart. The album was Krokus' most successful album to date, both commercially and critically. It boasted the hit power ballad "Screaming in the Night", which saw heavy rotation on MTV and would become one of the band's most recognizable songs. Judas Priest's Rob Halford contributed backing vocals on the song "Ready to Burn". Bassist/keyboardist/percussionist Chris von Rohr was fired in late 1983 due to his writing an article published in a main Swiss newspaper exposing the band's rock'n`roll habits, prior to the band's appearance at the RockPop Festival in Dortmund, Germany, with rhythm guitarist Mark Kohler switching over to bass and Patrick Mason, aka Patrick Mahassen, who had also played in the Swiss band Crown, taking over rhythm guitar duties for the remainder of the Headhunter tour; however, Mahassen exited the band prior to the recording of the next album, The Blitz, another Gold certified album, which the band completed as a four-piece.  The tour for this album featured Mark Kohler returning to his main instrument, with Andy Tanas, formerly of Black Oak Arkansas, joining on the bass.  These shows also featured Loverboy's Doug Johnson on keyboards. Meanwhile, von Rohr would go on to produce the band Headhunter's eponymous 1985 album, featuring future Krokus members Peter Tanner and Many Maurer, and release a solo album in 1987, entitled Hammer & Tongue (re-issued in 1993 as The Good, The Bad and The Dog after the release of von Rohr's autobiography, "Hunde wollt ihr ewig rocken"), which featured contributions from his former Krokus bandmates, Marc Storace and Fernando von Arb.

Pushed into a corner by their own management and record company, 1984 saw the band move in a Glam rock direction with The Blitz, which featured a cover of Sweet's 1973 hit "The Ballroom Blitz". Though a commercial success, the album was panned critically. The band hit the Billboard Hot 100 with "Midnite Maniac" from that album, becoming the first Swiss act to do so. Capitalizing on the wave of success enjoyed by heavy metal in the mid-1980s, the band then released Change of Address in 1986, which featured a cover of the Alice Cooper standard "School's Out". The album production was way too clean and polished for Krokus and it became a commercial failure. As a counterbalance, Krokus soon released a live album entitled Alive and Screamin' while the band transitioned from Arista Records to MCA for the release of their Heart Attack album in 1988. Heart Attack was a last desperate attempt to keep the band together. It saw the return of bassist/keyboardist/percussionist Chris von Rohr with Dani Crivelli (who had played on von Rohr's solo album the previous year) on drums and was similarly written and produced in the band's early 80's style. However, the Swiss flagship of international heavy rock needed time out. Fernando and Marc had endured 8 years of constant writing, recording and touring with hardly any time off. Coming dangerously close to a burn-out they went on hiatus at the end of 1988. Von Rohr, Kohler and Crivelli tried to continue with Swedish vocalist Björn Lodin (from the bands Baltimoore and Six Feet Under) and lead guitarist Many Maurer, Crivelli's former bandmate from Killer. That line-up was short lived and never recorded any material.

Later years (1989–2006) 
Guitarist Fernando von Arb would remain the sole constant member throughout most of the 1990s as Krokus carried on with ever-changing line-ups. 1990's Stampede featured von Arb, former Headhunter members Peter Tanner (ex-Bloody Six, Witchcraft) and Many Maurer (ex-Killer), drummer Peter Haas (ex-Calhoun Conquer), and bassist Tony Castell. 1995 saw a brief reunion of the classic One Vice at a Time line-up, minus von Rohr, on the To Rock or Not to Be album. Welsh vocalist Carl Sentance (ex-Persian Risk, Geezer Butler Band) joined the band for Round 13, with Haas returning on drums.  In 2003, the band released Rock the Block with the new line-up of Marc Storace on vocals, Fernando von Arb on lead guitar, bass and keyboards, Dominique Favez on rhythm and lead guitar, Tony Castell on bass and rhythm guitar, and Patrick Aeby on drums and percussion. In 2004 the same line-up released the live CD Fire and Gasoline.

In 2005, longtime guitarist/bassist/keyboardist Fernando von Arb left the band because of continuing wrist problems which required surgery. Mandy Meyer, who had played with the band in the early 1980s, replaced von Arb in the then current line-up. The new formation (Storace, Meyer, Favez, Castell, Stefan Schwarzmann and Dennis Ward) recorded the studio album Hellraiser in 2006, which went to gold in Switzerland on the first day of sales. It generally received very good reviews. In an interview in 2008, Marc Storace stated that Krokus was becoming more and more "metal". Prior to the album's release date, the band already released the ballad "Angel of My Dreams" as a downloadable MP3.

Reunion with "classic lineup" (2007–2011) 
On 18 November 2007, the lineup featuring Chris von Rohr, Fernando von Arb, Freddy Steady and Marc Storace reunited to play a medley ("Tokyo Nights", "Bedside Radio" and "Heatstrokes") during the TV show, Die grössten Schweizer Hits, on Swiss television. This led to their reunion concert on 2 August 2008 (with the addition of Mark Kohler). Krokus's cover of Sweet's "The Ballroom Blitz" also appeared in the 2007 game Guitar Hero Encore: Rocks the 80s.

It was announced on 20 April 2008, that the classic lineup of Chris von Rohr, Fernando von Arb, Freddy Steady, Mark Kohler and Marc Storace had reunited, and would be releasing a new studio record in 2010 with a supporting world tour. On 2 August 2008, the band performed live in the Stade de Suisse in Bern. Krokus performed the official anthem of the 2009 Ice Hockey World Championships, hosted by Switzerland. The song was entitled "Live for the Action".

On 3 March 2010, the album Hoodoo including a cover version of Steppenwolf's "Born to Be Wild" and ten other songs, was released. It came in a regular and limited edition, the latter containing a DVD featuring concert footage.

In May 2011, drummer/percussionist Fready Steady announced he was leaving the band.

Reunion with Mandy Meyer and retirement (2012–present) 

In December 2012, it was announced guitarist Mandy Meyer was once again rejoining the band after having filled in for an ailing Fernando von Arb at the Loud Park Festival in Japan in October 2011. Krokus released their seventeenth studio album Dirty Dynamite on 22 February 2013.

On 21 April 2013, it was reported that former drummer/percussionist Dani Crivelli, who played on the band's 1988 Heart Attack, had died. According to the German language Swiss daily Blick, Crivelli fell off a bridge to his death in Trimbach, Canton of Solothurn.

Swiss drummer/percussionist Flavio Mezzodi joined Krokus in May 2013 and played on their "Dirty Dynamite Tour". The band sold out an unprecedented 4 shows at the Kofmehl (House of Rust) in their hometown of Solothurn. The concerts were recorded for an upcoming live album and the fourth concert was released as Long Stick Goes Boom: Live from da House of Rust in 2014.

In April/May 2015 the band returned for some dates in the United States, where they had not performed since 2005. Fernando von Arb was not part of that tour, as he cannot travel for long distances and Krokus performed as a 5-piece band. This was another reason why Mandy Meyer was brought back into the fold in 2013 as second lead guitarist. Mark Kohler also needs to take longer leaves of absence from the band and in his place Dominique Favez will play once more rhythm guitar. Dominique recorded on the 2003 Rock the Block album, 2004's Fire and Gasoline and 2006's Hellraiser and is no stranger to Krokus fans.

The band's 18th studio release, a covers album entitled Big Rocks, was issued in January 2017.

In September 2018, Krokus announced their retirement and would embark on their farewell tour in 2019.

In June 2019, the band announced a final tour to take place in North America starting in 2020, but the dates were postponed due to the COVID-19 pandemic. In April 2020, the band announced, via their Instagram account, plans to restart their final tour in 2021:

Although the tour did not happen in 2021 either, in April 2022, vocalist Marc Storace still expressed interest in finishing the tour sometime in the future.

Origin of band name 
The band name Krokus is German for crocus, a flower common throughout Europe. Early in the spring of 1975, band founder Chris von Rohr observed a field of these flowers while traveling by train. He was returning from L'Ecole des Chefs located in France after an aborted career in the culinary arts, and it was around this time the idea for the band was formed. The band members stated that it was the perfect name, since it featured "rok" in the middle.

Discography

Studio albums

Compilation albums 
Early Days '75–'78 (1980)
Stayed Awake All Night – The Best (1989)
The Dirty Dozen (1993)
Definitive Collection (2000)
The Collection (2000)
Best Of (2000)
Headhunter Blitz (2002)
Long Stick Goes Boom: The Anthology (2003)

Live albums 
Alive and Screamin' (1986)
Long Stick Goes Boom: Live from da House of Rust (2014)
Adios Amigos: Live @ Wacken (2021)

Singles

Videos and DVDs 
The Video Blitz (1985, VHS & LaserDisc)
Screaming in the Night (1986, VHS)
Fire and Gasoline (2004, bonus DVD)
As Long as We Live (2004, DVD)
Live at Rocksound Festival, Huttwil 2006  (2006, DVD)
Hoodoo (2010, DVD)
Krokus Live at Baloise Session (2014, Blu-ray disc)
Brooklyn Zoo Club 1982 (2015, DVD)
Krokus – The Early Years 1977–1981 (2017, DVD)

Band members 

Current members
Chris von Rohr – bass, keyboards, percussion, drums, vocals 
Fernando von Arb – lead and rhythm guitars, keyboards, bass, vocals 
Marc "The Voice" Storace – lead vocals 
Armand "Mandy" Meyer – lead and rhythm guitars 
Mark "Koki" Kohler – rhythm and lead guitars, bass 
Flavio Mezzodi – drums, percussion

See also 
List of glam metal bands and artists

References

External links 

1975 establishments in Switzerland
Arista Records artists
Musical groups established in 1975
Musical quintets
People from the canton of Solothurn
Swiss glam metal musical groups
Swiss hard rock musical groups
Swiss heavy metal musical groups
People from Solothurn